Sahar Ghoreishi (born 27 December 1987) is an Iranian actress.

Personal life 
Sahar Ghoreishi was born in Tehran. She married Mehran Akhavan Zakeri in 2004; they divorced in 2009. She had a short-term relationship with Iranian footballer Mehdi Taremi. Ghoreishi began dating Iranian singer Amir Tataloo in May 2022.

Career 
Ghoreishi began her career performing a role in the television show Laj-o-Laj Bazi (English: "Pertinacity") (2009), and she rose to fame among Iranians by starring in the TV series Delnavazan. She is also active in brand endorsement and modelling.

Filmography

References

External links

1987 births
Living people
People from Tehran
Actresses from Tehran
Association footballers' wives and girlfriends
Iranian film actresses
Iranian television actresses